The Savannah Theatre, first opened in 1818 and located on Chippewa Square in Savannah, Georgia, is one of the United States' oldest continually-operating theatres. The structure has been both a live performance venue and a movie theater. Since 2002, the theatre has hosted regular performances of a variety of shows, primarily music revues.

History 

The Savannah Theatre opened its doors at 5:30pm on December 4, 1818 with a performance of "The Soldier's Daughter". The original structure was designed by British architect William Jay, whose other notable works include the Telfair Mansion and the Owens-Thomas House, both located in Savannah. During the 1850s and 1860s, it was sometimes known as the Athenaeum. On March 21, 1861, Alexander H. Stephens delivered the Cornerstone Speech at the theatre.

The original structure suffered severe damage due to a hurricane that hit Savannah on August 31, 1898, tearing sections of the roof off the building and flooding the auditorium. Additionally, the Theatre has undergone two notable structural overhauls as the result of fires in 1906 and 1948. Following the 1948 fire, the building was transformed to its current Art Deco style.

Notable players 

Over the past two centuries, the Savannah Theatre has showcased an array of talented performers, including Fanny Davenport, E. H. Sothern, Julia Marlowe, Otis Skinner, Oscar Wilde Sarah Bernhardt, W. C. Fields, Tyrone Power, and Lillian Russell. Edwin Booth played several engagements at the Theatre in February 1876, with Shakespearean roles including Hamlet, Iago, and King Lear. It is unknown as to whether or not Edwin's younger brother John Wilkes Booth ever performed at the Savannah Theatre.

In 1851, the New York Dramatic Company leased the Theatre briefly. Among the players was Joseph Jefferson, whose most well-known role was that of Washington Irving's "Rip Van Winkle". However the company's stand failed to succeed, as their "lineup of standard hits failed to tempt Savannah audiences."

One of the more memorable performances in the Theatre's history came in November 1911, when baseball great Ty Cobb appeared in The College Widow.

The theatre today 

Beginning in 2002 with the music revue "Lost in the `50s", the Theatre has housed live performances of several productions.

References

Bibliography

External links 
The Historic Savannah Theatre
Don’t miss Historic Savannah Theatre, enduring part of city’s history
Savannah Theatre - Cinema Treasures

Entertainment venues in Savannah, Georgia
Theatres in Georgia (U.S. state)
Tourist attractions in Savannah, Georgia
Music venues in Georgia (U.S. state)
1818 establishments in Georgia (U.S. state)
Theatres completed in 1818
Chippewa Square buildings
Savannah Historic District